Ahmedpur or Ahmadpur may refer to:

 Ahmedpur, Birbhum, a town in Birbhum district in the Indian state of West Bengal
 Ahmedpur, Latur, a city and a Municipal council in Latur district in the state of Maharashtra, India
 Ahmedpur, Jaunpur, a village in Jaunpur, Uttar Pradesh
 Ahmadpur East, a tehsil of Bahawalpur District, Punjab, Pakistan
 Ahmedpur Sial, is a city of Jhang District, Punjab, Pakistan
 Ahmadpur taluka taluka in Latur district